"25 or 6 to 4" is a song written by American musician Robert Lamm, one of the founding members of the band Chicago. It was recorded in 1969 for their second album, Chicago, with Peter Cetera on lead vocals.

Composition
In a 2013 interview, Robert Lamm said he composed "25 or 6 to 4" on a twelve-string guitar with only ten strings — it was missing the two low E strings — and that he wrote the lyrics in one day. The band first rehearsed the song at the Whisky a Go Go.

Lamm said the song is about trying to write a song in the middle of the night. The song's title is the time at which the song is set: 25 or 26 minutes before 4 AM (twenty-five or [twenty-]six [minutes] to four [o’clock]). Because of the unique phrasing of the song's title, "25 or 6 to 4" has been interpreted to mean everything from a quantity of illicit drugs to the name of a famous person in code.

The song's opening guitar riff has been compared to chord progressions and riffs in other songs. In the opinion of writer Melissa Locker: LA Weeklys music editor, Andy Hermann, names it "The Riff" and describes it as follows:Hermann details the riff's similarity to the chord progression in Led Zeppelin's version of "Babe I'm Gonna Leave You" by Anne Bredon, which came out a year before "25 or 6 to 4", and the similarity of that chord progression to one in George Harrison's song "While My Guitar Gently Weeps", which came out even earlier. He labels "Brain Stew", released in 1996, as "derivative" by comparison to "25 or 6 to 4".

Original version
The original recording features an electric guitar solo using a wah-wah pedal by Chicago guitarist Terry Kath, and a lead vocal line in the Aeolian mode.

The album was released in January 1970 and the song was edited and released as a single in June (omitting the second verse and most of the guitar solo), climbing to number 4 on the US Billboard Hot 100 chart and number 7 on the UK Singles Chart. It was the band's first song to reach the top five in the US. It has been included in numerous Chicago compilation albums. In 2015, Dave Swanson, writing for Ultimate Classic Rock, listed the song as number one on his top ten list of Chicago songs. Classic Rock Review says the song is "one of the most indelible Chicago tunes". In 2019, Bobby Olivier and Andrew Unterberger, music critics for Billboard magazine, ranked the song number one on their list of "The 50 Best Chicago Songs". Guitar World rated "25 or 6 to 4" no. 22 for "greatest wah solos of all time."

Bans
The song was banned in Singapore in 1970 due to "alleged allusions to drugs"; the ban extended to later albums that included the song, such as Chicago 18. In 1993, the ban on this song was lifted, along with long-time bans on songs by other artists such as the Beatles, Bob Dylan and Creedence Clearwater Revival.

Later versions
An updated version of "25 or 6 to 4" was recorded for the 1986 album Chicago 18 with James Pankow listed as co-writer, and new band member Jason Scheff on lead vocals. It featured two verses instead of three. The single reached number 48 on the US chart. This version was also used as the B-side for the band's next single in 1986, "Will You Still Love Me?"

Through the 2010s, "25 or 6 to 4" continued to be a staple in Chicago's live concert set list and in Peter Cetera's solo concert set list. In 2016, the group's former drummer Danny Seraphine reunited on stage with Chicago to perform "25 or 6 to 4" and two other songs at their induction ceremony for the Rock and Roll Hall of Fame.

Music video
The music video for the 1986 remake won an American Video Award, in the Best Cinematography category, for Bobby Byrne.

Personnel 
 Peter Cetera – lead vocals, bass
 Terry Kath – guitars, backing vocals
 Robert Lamm – piano, backing vocals
 Danny Seraphine – drums
 Jimmy Pankow – trombone
 Lee Loughnane – trumpet
 Walt Parazaider – tenor saxophone

Chart performance

Weekly charts

Year-end charts

Covers and parodies 
The song has been covered by various artists, including Straitjacket, Local H, Intruder, Bruce Foxton, The Moog Cookbook, Earth, Wind & Fire, Paul Gilbert, Pacifika, Mötley Crüe lead singer Vince Neil, Umphrey's McGee, Nick Ingman, and as an instrumental on the Dave Koz collaboration album Summer Horns. Constantine Maroulis released his version of the song as a single in 2011.

In 2005, Jonathan Coulton made "When I'm 25 or 64", a mashup of "25 or 6 to 4" with "When I'm Sixty-Four" by The Beatles.

In popular culture
"25 or 6 to 4" has become a popular song for marching bands to play. In 2018 Kevin Coffey of the Omaha World-Herald named it as the number one "marching band song of all time". As performed by the Jackson State University marching band, the HBCU Sports website ranked it number seven of the "Top 20 Cover Songs of 2018 by HBCU Bands". In a nod to its popularity with marching bands, Chicago performed "25 or 6 to 4" and "Saturday in the Park" with the Notre Dame Marching Band on the football field during halftime on October 21, 2017.

The song has been used in popular media as well. It appears as an on-disc track in the video game Rock Band 3; has been featured on the animated TV series King of the Hill's season 11 episode, "Luanne Gets Lucky"; and was used in the 2017 film I, Tonya, directed by Craig Gillespie and starring Margot Robbie and Sebastian Stan.

Influence
Jason Newsted, former bassist of Metallica, says that this song was the first rock or metal riff he ever learned to play.

Paul Gilbert, former guitarist of Racer X and Mr. Big, says that a "really primitive version" of "25 or 6 to 4" was one of the first songs he taught himself to play on the guitar, using one string.

References

External links
 Lyrics of this song
 

1969 songs
1970 singles
1986 singles
Chicago (band) songs
Songs written by Robert Lamm
Song recordings produced by James William Guercio
Columbia Records singles